15 is the third studio album by American rock band Buckcherry. It was released in Japan on October 17, 2005 through Universal Japan and on April 6, 2006 in North America, through Eleven Seven Music, as the label's first release. It features a new line-up. "Crazy Bitch" was the first single off the album and enjoyed success on the pop charts. The second single was "Next 2 You" which peaked at No. 18 on the Hot Mainstream Rock Tracks chart. 

The band confirmed, via Myspace, that the album has been certified Platinum by the RIAA for sales of 1,000,000 copies surpassing their debut album and since then it has been certified double platinum. The fifth and last single, "Sorry", has become their highest charting single to date on the US Hot 100. After 98 weeks on the Billboard 200, the album became the first Buckcherry album to reach the top 40, peaking at 39. "Pump it Up", a Japanese edition bonus track, is used by the NHL's Edmonton Oilers as their introduction song.

Title

The name of the album comes from the number of days it took the band to record it.

Track listing

Personnel

Buckcherry
 Josh Todd – lead vocals
 Keith Nelson – lead guitar
 Jimmy Ashhurst – bass guitar
 Stevie Dacanay – rhythm guitar
 Xavier Muriel – drums

Additional musicians
 Mark Watrous – keyboards
 Jim Cox – string arrangements

Production
 Paul DeCarli – producer
 Mike Plotnikoff – producer, engineer, mixing
 Ted Jensen – mastering
 Bruce Sugar – engineer
 Chris Henry – assistant engineer

Certifications

Charts

References

Buckcherry albums
2005 albums
Universal Music Group albums
Eleven Seven Label Group albums